This is a list of airlines currently operating in Oman.

Scheduled airlines

Government airlines

See also
 Transport in Oman
 List of airlines
 List of defunct airlines of Oman

Oman
Airlines
Oman
Airlines of Oman
Airlines